Xystrocera alcyonea (sometimes spelled Xystocera alcyonea) is a species of beetle in the family Cerambycidae. It was described by Pascoe in 1866, recorded from Malaysia.

References

Cerambycinae
Beetles described in 1866